Acianthera gracilis is a species of orchid endemic to Brazil (Minas Gerais).

References

gracilis
Orchids of Minas Gerais